Daniel Natea (born 21 April 1992) is a Romanian judoka. He competed at the 2016 Summer Olympics in the men's +100 kg event, in which he was eliminated in the second round by Abdullo Tangriev.

References

External links
 
 
 
 
 

1992 births
Living people
Romanian male judoka
Olympic judoka of Romania
Judoka at the 2016 Summer Olympics
Judoka at the 2015 European Games
European Games competitors for Romania
20th-century Romanian people
21st-century Romanian people